The Lt. Ray Enners Award is presented annually to the most outstanding high school lacrosse player on Long Island's Suffolk County, New York.  The award is presented by the Suffolk County Boys Lacrosse Coaches Association, Section XI Athletics, to the player who best exemplifies courage, teamwork, skill and leadership. The award is named in memory of Raymond Enners.

Lt. Enners was raised in Farmingdale, New York and attended Half Hollow Hills High School (Half Hollow Hills Central School District) in Dix Hills, New York, where he was an outstanding lacrosse player. He was voted to the 1963 All-Long Island lacrosse team. Lt. Enners also played lacrosse at the United States Military Academy at West Point (Class of 1967). 

Following high school, Lt. Enners continued to excel at lacrosse at the United States Military Academy. During his 1967 senior year, Lt. Enners was an NCAA Honorable Mention All-American. He was inducted posthumously into the Suffolk Sports Hall of Fame during 2004. 

While leading a platoon in Vietnam, Lt. Enners was killed in combat on September 18, 1968. Lt. Enners received the Distinguished Service Cross, the Bronze Star Medal and the Purple Heart for extraordinary heroism in combat in South Vietnam. During 2016, Richard W. Enners, Lt. Enners' younger brother who also is a graduate of the U.S. Military Academy at West Point, authored the book, Heart of Gray. The book details the story about his brother, Alpha Company, 1-20th Infantry, 11th Brigade, and Lt. Enners' courage and sacrifice in Vietnam.

At the start of the 2019 lacrosse season, Half Hollow Hills High School (now known as Half Hollow Hills East High School) retired Lt. Enners' number 26 lacrosse jersey. At the same ceremony, the school also retired the number 21 lacrosse jersey worn by alumnus James Metzger, the 1977 recipient of the Lt. Ray Enners Award. 

The initial Lt. Ray Enners Award was presented during 1970. This award is one of three that have been named in memory of Lt. Enners.  The others are the Lt. Raymond Enners Award that is presented to the NCAA National Player of the Year in men's lacrosse and The Lt. Enners–Chris Pettit Award that is presented each season to Army's offensive most valuable player.

For more information about Lt. Enners and the Suffolk County high school award named in his honor, see the June 15, 2016 Suffolk County Lacrosse Coach's Association Awards Program, page 19.

References

External links
 Suffolk County Ray Enners Award Winners official website

Lacrosse trophies and awards
American sports trophies and awards
High school sports in New York (state)
Sports in Long Island
+
Awards established in 1970
1970 establishments in New York (state)